The theory of female cosmetic coalitions (FCC) represents a controversial attempt to explain the  evolutionary emergence of art, ritual and symbolic culture in Homo sapiens. The theory was proposed by evolutionary anthropologists Chris Knight and Camilla Power together with archaeologist Ian Watts. 

Supporters of this theory contest the prevailing assumption that the earliest art was painted or engraved on external surfaces such as cave walls or rock faces. They argue instead that art is much older than previously thought and that the canvas was initially the human body. The earliest art, according to FCC, consisted of predominantly blood-red designs produced on the body for purposes of cosmetic display.

Female cosmetic coalitions as a conceptual approach links:

 Darwin's theory of evolution by natural and sexual selection
 research into sexual signalling by wild-living monkeys and apes
 the fossil record of encephalization in human evolution
 recent archaeological discoveries of  red-ochre pigments dating back to the speciation in Africa of Homo sapiens around 250,000 years ago
 modern hunter-gatherer ethnography

These seemingly divergent topics come together in a co-authored publication attempting to explain why the world today is populated by modern Homo sapiens instead of by the equally large-brained, previously successful Neanderthals. An article published in the journal Current Anthropology in 2016 gives an account of exhaustive archaeological testing of the FCC theory, including robust debate between specialists.

Details of the FCC model

Reproductive synchrony

In primates, reproductive synchrony usually takes the form of conception and birth seasonality. The regulatory 'clock', in this case, is the sun's position in relation to the tilt of the earth. In nocturnal or partly nocturnal primates—for example, owl monkeys— the periodicity of the moon may also come into play. Synchrony in general is for primates an important variable determining the extent of 'paternity skew'—defined as the extent to which fertile matings can be monopolised by a fraction of the population of males. The greater the precision of female reproductive synchrony—the greater the number of ovulating females who must be guarded simultaneously—the harder it is for any dominant male to succeed in monopolising a harem all to himself. This is simply because, by attending to any one fertile female, the male unavoidably leaves the others at liberty to mate with his rivals. The outcome is to distribute paternity more widely across the total male population, reducing paternity skew (figures a, b).

Concealed ovulation, synchrony and evolution
Reproductive synchrony can never be perfect. On the other hand, theoretical models predict that group-living species will tend to synchronise wherever females can benefit by maximising the number of males offered chances of paternity, minimising reproductive skew. The same models predict that female primates, including evolving humans, will tend to synchronise wherever fitness benefits can be gained by securing access to multiple males. Conversely, group-living females who need to restrict paternity to a single dominant harem-holder should assist him by avoiding synchrony.

In the human case, according to FCC, evolving females with increasingly heavy childcare burdens would have done best by resisting attempts at harem-holding by locally dominant males. No human female needs a partner who will get her pregnant only to disappear, abandoning her in favour of his next sexual partner. To any local group of females, the more such philandering can be successfully resisted—and the greater the proportion of previously excluded males who can be included in the breeding system and persuaded to invest effort—the better. By evolving concealed ovulation and continuous receptivity, females force males into longer periods of consortship if they are to have a good chance of achieving impregnation (figures c,d). Reproductive synchrony —whether seasonal, lunar or a combination of the two—is a key strategy for reproductive levelling, reducing paternity skew and involving more males in investment in offspring. Greater reproductive synchrony owing to seasonality during glacial cycles may have differentiated Neanderthal reproductive strategies from those of Homo sapiens ancestors.

Costs of increasing brain-size

In this model, the factor driving female strategies is the high cost to females of increasingly large-brained offspring, requiring increased investment from males. As females of Homo heidelbergensis, the ancestor of Neanderthals and modern humans, came under increasing selection pressure for larger brain size within the past half million years, they needed more energy in support. This meant greater productivity by males as hunters. However, in the Darwinian world of primate sexual competition, males may be more interested in finding new fertile females than in supplying the needs of breast-feeding mothers and their infants. Women, unlike chimpanzees, do not show their fertile time. But females cannot easily disguise menstruation. Menstrual periods mark out very clearly which females are coming close to fertility among other females who are pregnant and lactating. Dominant males could therefore target the cycling females and neglect those most in need of support.

Menstruation, synchrony and cosmetics

FCC proponents argue that menstruation became a key problem because it potentially creates conflicts between the females and conflicts between males. Menstruation has little social impact among chimpanzees or bonobos, since visible oestrus swellings are the focus of male attention. But once external signs of ovulation had been phased out in the human lineage, according to FCC, menstruation became salient as the one remaining external promise of fertility. Potentially, dominant males might exploit such information, repeatedly targeting newly cycling females at the expense of pregnant or nursing mothers (figure e). Those who might lose male investment needed to take control. According to FCC, older and more experienced females did this by initiating newly cycling females into their kin-based coalitions (figures f, g). Red ochre pigments allowed women to take conscious control over their signals, resisting any dominant male strategy of picking and choosing between them on biological grounds. It is argued that because precise, sustained menstrual synchrony is difficult to achieve, painting up with blood-red pigments was the next best thing, enabling the benefits of artificial, ritually constructed synchrony.

Effect on male strategies

To explore a male strategic point of view, proponents of FCC make a simple model of alternative strategies. Female A uses cosmetics as part of her ritual coalition whenever one of them menstruates; Female B and all her female neighbors use no cosmetics. Male A is prepared to work/invest to gain access; Male B tries a philanderer strategy, moving to the next cycling fertile female, neglecting the previous partner once she is pregnant. Very quickly, Male A will end up working/doing bride-service for Female A's coalition, since he has no competition from Male B. Male A gains regular fitness as a result. Male B will pair up with Female B, but is then liable to abandon her if he finds a new cycling female. She then has little support during pregnancy/breastfeeding. The question will be whether Male B gains sufficient fitness via a roving strategy of picking up cycling, non-cosmetic females. If Male A is not able to compete with Male B in terms of dominance, he is better off choosing the cosmetic females. Because Female B and her non-cosmetic female neighbors get the attentions, but no reliable investment, from Male B, they discourage any investment from the likes of Male A. Once costs of encephalization begin to bite and cooperative strategies are needed to support offspring, how many females will be choosing philanderers in preference to investors? Those females are not likely to be ancestors of large-brained hominins like ourselves or the Neanderthals.

Reverse dominance, sacredness and taboo

Female strategies of counter-dominance culminated, according to this body of theory, in the eventual overthrow of primate-style dominance and its replacement by hunter-gatherer-style 'reverse dominance'. 'Reverse dominance' is defined by evolutionary anthropologists as an inverted social hierarchy—rule from below by an ungovernable community. To maintain this social order, women band together to resist being dominated by men.

The FCC model predicts the specific form of reverse dominance display needed by female coalitions resisting would-be dominant or philanderer males. Females needed to signal 'No' by constructing themselves as inviolable using red ocher pigments. To assert ritual power, they needed to go periodically on 'sex strike'. To defend themselves physically against harassment by non-kin males, defiant females needed to draw on the support of male kin—sons and brothers—as members of their reverse dominance coalitions. In order to reverse signals of sexual availability, it was logical to sing and dance an unmistakable message: 'Wrong species, wrong sex, wrong time!'. On this basis, FCC theory leads us to expect 'divine' or 'totemic' spiritual entities depicted in early rock art to be therianthropic ('wrong species'), sex-ambivalent ('wrong sex') and blood-red ('wrong time') (figure h).
 
This brings FCC into line with Ḗmile Durkheim, who argued that the earliest divine beings were ritually generated representations of society. Durkheim's 'society', according to FCC, was in the first instance the bottom-up authority of Female Cosmetic Coalitions.

Interpreting the ochre record

It was once thought that art and symbolic culture first emerged in Europe some 40,000 years ago, during the Middle-to-Upper Palaeolithic transition – often termed the 'symbolic explosion' or 'Upper Palaeolithic revolution'. Some archaeologists still adhere to this view. Others now accept that symbolic culture probably emerged in sub-Saharan Africa at a much earlier date, during the period known as the Middle Stone Age. The evidence consists of traditions of ground ochre with strong selection for the colour red, examples of so-called ochre 'crayons' which appear to have been used for purposes of design, probably on the body, and geometric engravings on blocks of ochre. All this apparently formed part of a cosmetics industry dated to between 100,000 and 200,000 years ago. In addition, from about 100,000 years ago, we have pierced shells which appear to show signs of wear, suggesting that they were strung together to make necklaces. If the ochre tradition has been correctly interpreted, it constitutes evidence for the world's first 'art'—an aspect of 'symbolic culture'—in the form of personal ornamentation and body-painting. An alternative viewpoint is that pigment-only decorative systems are merely individualistic display, not necessarily indicative of ritual, whereas the bead traditions testify to language, institutionalized relationships and full-scale ritual and symbolic culture.

The most thorough recent survey of the African Middle Stone Age (MSA) ochre record is presented by Rimtautas Dapschauskas and colleagues. In a meta-analysis of 100 African sites, they ask when and where habitual ochre use emerged and the significance this had for the development of ritual behavior. They directly address the Female Cosmetic Coalitions hypothesis and test its predictions. They identify three continent-wide distinct phases of ochre use: an initial phase (500-330 thousand years ago); an emergent phase (330-160 ka); and an habitual phase from 160 ka, when a third of sites from South to East Africa and up to North Africa contain red ochre. In agreement with the FCC model, the authors regard 'habitual ochre use as a proxy for the emergence of regular collective rituals'. They view 'a large proportion of ochre finds from the MSA as the material remains of past ritual activity'. This builds cogently on the position taken by the FCC team three decades ago – that the ochre marked ritual activity critical to the emergence of symbolic cognition.

Implications for the origins of language

Proponents of this model claim that it helps to explain when and how language in our species emerged. Among 'Machiavellian', competitive nonhuman primates, sex is a major source of conflict, mutual suspicion and mistrust, as a result of which group members attempt to minimise the cost of deception by responding only to bodily signals which are intrinsically 'hard to fake'. This social pressure from receivers prevents language from even beginning to emerge. FCC theorists argue that for signals as cheap and intrinsically unreliable as words to become socially accepted, unprecedentedly intense levels of in-group trust were required. An effect of the Female Cosmetic Coalitions strategy, claim its supporters, was to minimise internal sexual conflict within each gender group, giving rise to a trusting social atmosphere such as is found among extant human egalitarian hunter-gatherers. These new levels of public trust, according to supporters of the model, enabled our species' latent linguistic capacities to flourish where previously they had been suppressed.

{{quotation|Too many candidate theories are either too vague, or make predictions that fall outside the available evidence. In contrast, a good example in this regard is the Female Cosmetic Coalitions Model, which does provide specific testable predictions.|{{Citation|title= Johansson, S. 2014. How can a social theory of language evolution be grounded in evidence? In D. Dor, C. Knight and J. Lewis (eds), The Social Origins of Language. Oxford: Oxford University Press, pp. 64-56}}|}}

Testable predictions of the model

Its supporters claim that FCC is the only Darwinian theory to explain why there is so much red ochre in the early archaeological record of modern humans and why modern humans are then associated with red ochre wherever they went as they emerged from Africa. It is claimed that, more than any other theoretical model of modern human origins, FCC offers detailed and specific predictions testable in the light of data from a wide variety of disciplines.

Archaeology

 Earliest evidence of symbolic behaviour should be found in a cosmetics industry focused on blood-red pigments.

Palaeontology

 The time-window should fit with fossil evidence for encephalization rates. On this basis, the earliest onset of the strategy should neither pre-date c. 600,000 B.P. nor post-date c. 150,000 B.P., by which time modern levels of cranial capacity had evolved.

Kinship and male investment

 Matrilocal residence with bride service is expected as the initial situation.

Ethnography of magico-religious symbolism

 Counter-dominance should generate collective counter-reality. The first gods are therefore expected to be represented as WRONG + RED (wrong species/sex/time).
 Hunters' prohibitions on sex and menstruation are expected to operate within a lunar/menstrual cosmology.

In relation to Dapschauskas and colleagues' recent survey of the MSA ochre record, they confirm that there is no ochre in Acheulean levels (before 600,000 B.P.). While Dapschauskas and colleagues identify three phases of the ochre record – initial, emergent and habitual – the FCC team have argued for two basic stages, firstly an ad hoc stage with improvisatory use of cosmetics and then, driven by increased brain size, a second stage in which ocher use became regular and habitual while underpinning a symbolically structured sexual division of labour. Despite this difference, both teams agree on the critical point that humans began using ocher regularly and habitually for ritual purposes from around 160,000 years ago.

As Dapschauskas and colleagues acknowledge, Knight, Power and Watts had already invoked FCC to predict this date on theoretical grounds thirty years earlier. In an article published in 1995, the FCC team focused on the intersection of increasing brain size (putting extra energetic demands on mothers) with the cold, dry Marine Isotope Stage 6 (MIS6), when people would have experienced severe energy pinch points during lean, dry seasons. Anticipating Dapschauskas and colleagues, Knight, Power and Watts wrote at this time: 'Reproductive stress motoring "sham menstruation" may have become most acute in the period 160-140 Kya, the height of the Penultimate Glacial Cycle.'

Results
Proponents of FCC argue that the main predictions which can be derived from their model should be easy, in principle, to falsify. The theory is currently being debated, having received significant media coverage. Despite this, not all scholars agree and the model remains controversial.

See also
 
 Body art
 Body painting
 Cosmetics
 Human evolution
 The Human Revolution (human origins)
 Origins of society
 Sex strike
 Symbolic culture
 Prehistoric art
 Ochre
 Reproductive synchrony
 Menstrual synchrony
 Metaformic Theory

References

External links
 
 Knight, C. 1991. 'The Sex Strike'. Chapter 4 in Blood Relations. Menstruation and the origins of culture.'' New Haven and London: Yale University Press, pp. 122–153. 
 
 

Paleoanthropology
History of cosmetics
Prehistoric art
Sexual selection